Jugersi Liçkollari (born 24 March 1998 in Pogradeci) is an Albanian professional footballer who plays for Pogradeci in the Albanian First Division.

References

1998 births
Living people
People from Pogradec
Association football midfielders
Albanian footballers
Albania youth international footballers
KS Pogradeci players
KF Bylis Ballsh players
Kategoria e Parë players